ChinaSat 9A is a Chinese communications satellite operated by China Satellite Communications.

References 

Communications satellites in geostationary orbit
Satellites of China
Communications satellites of China
Spacecraft launched in 2017
2017 in China
Partial satellite launch failures
Spacecraft launched by Long March rockets